The Ancient House is a grade II* listed house in Peasenhall, Suffolk, England. The house is timber-framed and is not ancient, dating from the mid-sixteenth century with an  eighteenth century facade. It was extensively altered in the late nineteenth century. It was in the ownership of the furniture expert R.W. Symonds at the time of his death in 1958.

References 

Grade II* listed buildings in Suffolk
Grade II* listed houses
Timber framed buildings in Suffolk